Tranquility is an album by American jazz pianist Ahmad Jamal featuring performances recorded in 1968 and originally released on ABC-Paramount and subsequently rereleased on the Impulse! label in 1973.

Critical reception
Allmusic awarded the album 3 stars stating "While not to be ranked amongst his greatest works, Tranquility is a very fine recording and any opportunity to hear this master should not be missed".

Track listing
All compositions by Ahmad Jamal except where noted.
 "I Say a Little Prayer" (Burt Bacharach, Hal David) – 2:25 
 "The Look of Love" (Bacharach, David) – 2:48 
 "When I Look in Your Eyes" (Leslie Bricusse) – 4:18 
 "Illusions Opticas" (Joe Kennedy) – 2:25 
 "Nothing Ever Changes My Love for You" (Jack Segal, Marvin Fisher) – 2:42 
 "Emily" (Johnny Mandel, Johnny Mercer) – 3:41 
 "Tranquility" – 8:53 
 "Free Again" (Armand Canfora, Joss Baselli, Robert Colby) – 4:45 
 "Manhattan Reflections" – 6:25

Personnel
Ahmad Jamal – piano
Jamil Sulieman – bass
Frank Gant – drums

References 

ABC Records albums
Impulse! Records albums
Ahmad Jamal albums
1968 albums
Albums produced by Bob Thiele